Jason Göbel is an American musician.

He is best known for being a member of the technical metal band Cynic and playing guitar on their album Focus.

Life and career
Gobel joined Cynic in 1988, playing guitar on their demos and album Focus

He has also played with Portal, a lighter side project of the band Cynic, Gordian Knot, a band formed by Sean Malone, also a former Cynic member. Prior to this he played on Monstrosity's album Imperial Doom alongside future Cannibal Corpse vocalist George "Corpsegrinder" Fisher and future Malevolent Creation guitarist and bassist Jon Rubin and Mark Van Erp. He took a long break from the music industry starting in 2004.

He lives in Miami with his two children.

References

American heavy metal guitarists
Living people
American male guitarists
1970 births
21st-century American guitarists
21st-century American male musicians
Gordian Knot (band) members
Cynic (band) members